Enerpac Tool Group Corp, formerly Actuant Corporation, is a premier industrial tools, services, technology and solutions provider serving a broad and diverse set of customers in more than 100 countries. The Company makes complex, often hazardous jobs possible safely and efficiently. Enerpac Tool Group’s businesses are global leaders in high pressure hydraulic tools, controlled force products, and solutions for precise positioning of heavy loads that help customers safely and reliably tackle some of the most challenging jobs around the world. The Company was founded in 1910 and is headquartered in Menomonee Falls, Wisconsin. Enerpac Tool Group common stock trades on the NYSE under the symbol EPAC.

History

In 2010, historian John Gurda authored “The Drive To Lead”, a history of Actuant that celebrated the company’s 100th anniversary.

1910 Founded as American Grinder and Manufacturing

1927 Applied Power enters hydraulic business with Blackhawk

1958 Enerpac founded

1970 Power-Packer founded

1987 Applied Power initial public offering, trades on NASDAQ

1988 Applied Power acquires Gardner Bender from Gardner family

1989 Applied Power acquires Barry Wright Corporation

1992 Applied Power common stock trading moves to the NYSE

1996 Applied Power starts a roll-up of electronic contract manufacturers with the acquisition of Everest

1997 Applied Power acquires Versa Technologies, including Power Gear and Milwaukee Cylinder

1998 Applied Power reorganizes into two business groups: Industrial and Electronics to reflect the growth of the electronic contract manufacturing business

2000 Applied Power spins off its Electronics business segment into a separate public company called APW Ltd. The remainder of Applied Power, consisting of its former Industrial segment begins doing business as Actuant Corporation and trading on the NYSE as ATU.

2001 Applied Power changes name to Actuant

2002 Actuant successfully completes $105 million follow-on equity offering, using proceeds to retire 35% of 13% Senior Subordinated Notes

2003 Actuant acquires Heinrich Kopp A.G (European Electrical)

2004 Actuant acquires Kwikee Products (RV), and Dresco B.V. (European Electrical), and successfully completes $125,000 convertible bond offering.

2005 Actuant acquires Hedley Purvis and Hydratight Sweeney - initiating the Joint Integrity platform. Also completes its largest acquisition to date - Key Components, Inc - which included Gits, Marinco, Acme and Elliott.

2006 Actuant acquires D.L. Ricci, Precision Sure-Lock, Actown and BEP Marine.

2007 Actuant deploys $163 million of capital on five tuck-in acquisitions including Veha, Injectaseal, Maxima, TTF and BH Electronics.

2008 Actuant acquires TK Simplex and Superior Plant Services, both tuck-ins to the Industrial Segment.

2009 Actuant acquires Cortland adding a new platform (electro mechanical cables & umbilicals and engineered synthetic rope) to the portfolio.

2010 Actuant celebrates its centennial.

2010 CEO Bob Arzbaecher and Actuant management ring the closing bell at the NYSE celebrating centennial.

2010 CEO Arzbaecher talks with CNBC.

2011 Achieves record cash flow of $158 million and deploys just over $300 million to acquire Mastervolt and Weasler Engineering.

2012 Acquisition of Jeyco Pty. Ltd. in Australia, Turotest in Brazil, and CrossControl AB in Sweden.

2013 Divestiture of Actuant Electrical segment

2013 Acquisition of Viking Sea Tech .

2014 Mark Goldstein becomes President and CEO of Actuant Corporation

2015 Acquisition of Hayes Industries, Ltd for nearly 31 million US dollars. Hayes Industries, Ltd. and Precision Sure-Lock are combined to form Precision-Hayes International.

2015 Actuant names Board President Bob Arzbaecher interim CEO

2016 Randy Baker becomes President and CEO of Actuant Corporation

2016 Larzep SA and FourQuest MENAC acquired.

2017 Actuant acquires Mirage Machines; sells Viking SeaTech.

2018 Actuant acquires Equalizer International

2019 Actuant consolidates business to two segments: Industrial Tools & Services and Engineered Components & Systems

2019 Actuant sells off Engineer Components & Systems business to focus on Industrial Tools and Service, changing its name to Enerpac Tool Group.

2020 Enerpac Tool Group acquires controlled bolting sales and rental company HTL Group, UK

2021 Enerpac Tool Group announce Paul Sternlieb as the CEO and President

2022 Enerpac Tool Group announce the Ascend programme - Enhance Shareholder Value

Company Own Brands
 Enerpac
 Hydratight
 HTL Group
 Larzep
 Simplex

Awards and recognition

 The Robert W. Baird Outstanding Achievement Award in Employee Giving

 Forbes 400 Best Big Companies

 BusinessWeek Top 100 "Hot Growth Company"

 Investor's Business Daily: "Actuant Corp. Milwaukee, Wisconsin; Manufacturer is a switch-hitter on growth"
 Investor's Business Daily: "Actuant Seeks Out Niches To Make it Big Fish in Pond"

 Milwaukee Business Journal: "Andy Lampereur named CFO of the Year"

References

External links
 Enerpac Tool Group's company page
 Enerpac Website
 Enerpac Tool Group Investor Updates & News

Companies listed on the New York Stock Exchange
Companies based in Wisconsin
Conglomerate companies of the United States